Syrian or Syriac Christians may refer to

 Adherents of Christianity in Syria
 Adherents of Syriac Christianity, various Christian bodies of Syriac traditions, especially:
 Syriac/Assyrian/Aramean people, Christian neo-Aramaic speakers throughout the Middle East
 Saint Thomas Christians, Christians of Syriac tradition in India, also called Syrians or Nasrani

See also
 Syriac Church (disambiguation)
 Patriarchate of Antioch (disambiguation)
 Syrian Catholic (disambiguation)
 Syriac Orthodox Church
 Syria (disambiguation)